The Christchurch Northern Motorway is the main northern route into and out of Christchurch, New Zealand.

The motorway, which heads in a northerly direction, is approximately 16.5 km in length. It links the suburb of St Albans with Pineacres, south of Woodend, bypassing the outer suburban areas of Northcote, Redwood, Belfast, and Kaiapoi. At its southern end, it connects with QEII drive where SH 74 continues east as an expressway, and links south to Cranford Street from where vehicles can access the City Centre.

is four-lane divided except for the two-lane undivided section between the Lineside Road/Smith Street interchange and the northern terminus. The motorway forms part of SH 1. The southern end of the motorway is being extended to QEII Drive in the Christchurch suburb of Mairehau; this extension forms part of SH 74.

Route

The Christchurch Northern Motorway begins in the suburb of St Albans at a roundabout intersection with Cranford Street, approximately six kilometres north of the Christchurch Central City. The initial one kilometre section links to the official start of the motorway at a full diamond interchange with Queen Elizabeth II Drive where it becomes SH 74. The motorway continues north for several kilometers to the east of Northcote, Redwood, Northwood, and Belfast. Prestons and Radcliffe roads pass over the motorway, and there is a half diamond interchange (south facing) at Belfast Road. This section of the motorway is called the Christchurch Northern Corridor.

The motorway then passes over the Main North Railway Line and Main North Road shortly before a large interchange at Chaneys, north of Belfast. Here, the motorway merges with the Western Belfast Bypass motorway, which forms part of a bypass to the west of the city known as the Western Corridor and becomes SH 1. There are also connections to and from Main North Road at the southern end of the interchange  (facing south only), and a single southbound off ramp at the northern end of the interchange. This section of the motorway incorporates a southbound peak hours only T2 transit lane.

The motorway then passes over the Waimakariri River. This short section of the motorway is six lanes wide to the Tram Road interchange, and the bridge incorporates cycling and walking connections. The motorway then runs to the west of Kaiapoi with interchanges at Chaneys (with Main North Road), Tram Road, Ohoka Road, and Lineside Road, the last providing access to Rangiora via .

From the Lineside Road interchange, the motorway reduces to just two lanes (one in each direction) and is undivided for the last 3 km of its length. The motorway officially ends at Pineacres, where it intersects with Main North Road again.

History

Plans for a motorway network in Christchurch were first revealed in 1962, with the release of the Christchurch Master Transportation Plan. Under this original plan the Northern Motorway was to run south from Chaneys (where it would link with other plans for the motorway heading further north), to the east of Belfast and Redwood and through Mairehau, St Albans and the Central City, to connect with the planned Christchurch Southern Motorway at Waltham. Significant on and off ramp complexes were planned where the motorway passed through the Central City, and a large three-way interchange with flyovers was planned in Waltham to connect with the Christchurch Southern Motorway and to a planned expressway to Opawa.

The first section of the Northern Motorway opened on 17 October 1967. The initial section ran from Main North Road at Dickeys Road to Tram Road, with northbound lanes continuing as far as Neeves Road. The section from Tram Road to Pineacres, bypassing Kaiapoi, opened on 17 December 1970. This was not part of the Christchurch Master Transportation Plan, but was designed to link into these plans further to the south. Plans for extending the motorway towards the city were scaled back in 1975 so that the Christchurch Northern Motorway would terminate at the northern edge of the CBD at Bealey Avenue. In the mid-1990s, the motorway designation through St Albans was removed, with the planned extension now terminating at Queen Elizabeth II Drive.

A $4.6 million project to add new north facing on and off ramps to the Lineside Road interchange, to increase motorway accessibility north from Kaiapoi and relieve the dangerous Pineacres intersection, was completed in 2014.

Beginning in 2015, the Western Belfast Bypass motorway was constructed as part of the Christchurch Western Corridor (forming SH 1) in order to remove traffic from the suburb of Belfast, New Zealand. A direct link between the Western Belfast bypass and Christchurch Northern Motorway was constructed at Chaneys, allowing north–south traffic not bound for the city to bypass the busy Main North Road. This project was completed in late 2017.

As part of the New Zealand Roads of National Significance Programme, the Christchurch Northern Motorway was extended from Chaneys interchange to an interchange at QEII Drive, with a local road continuing on to Cranford Street at Innes Road. This bypassed Main North Road through Belfast, Northwood, Redwood and Northcote to terminate at QEII Drive with a full diamond interchange. An off-road cycleway was also completed between QEII Drive and Belfast Road. A contract was awarded in August 2016 for the $240 million motorway extension project. Construction commenced in October 2016 with the new section of motorway opening in December 2020. This extended the length of the motorway to approximately 16.5 km. Cranford Street wasbe upgraded to four lanes from the new motorway terminus to the Innes Road intersection as a Christchurch City Council delivered project. QEII drive was widened to four lanes between Main North Road and Marshland Road as part of this project.

Projected congestion issues saw late changes to the motorway project, including the implementation of a T2 Transit lane southbound on the inner motorway lane, and changes to local roads in St Albans to discourage rat running, and encourage public transport uptake.

Future

Proposed projects associated with the Christchurch Northern Motorway, from north to south:

 Woodend Bypass – A proposed extension of the Northern Motorway from Pineacres to just north of Woodend. It would pass to the east of Woodend and to the west of Pegasus and would carry about 80 percent of the current 14,000 vehicles travelling through Woodend. The existing section of motorway between the Lineside Road interchange and Pineacres would be duplicated to four lanes. NZTA is currently seeking a designation for its preferred route. It is expected to be built in the next 10–15 years (reviewed periodically).
 Pineacres Intersection Improvements – Subject to funding, improvements to the Pineacres intersection, at the northern end of the motorway, will be looked at when the Lineside Road Interchange project is complete. This work is likely to include the widening of the existing road and the construction of islands at the intersection to improve lane separation.

Major junctions

References

Transport in Christchurch
Motorways in New Zealand
State Highway 1 (New Zealand)